Ferozsons (Pvt) Limited (also Ferozsons Publishers) is a Pakistani publishing company in Lahore, Pakistan. Established in 1894, it is Pakistan’s oldest publishing house.

In 1954, the Ferozsons Business Group expanded when one of the family members founded Ferozsons Laboratories, one of Pakistan’s first pharmaceutical companies.

History 

Maulvi Ferozuddin was one of the most prominent scholars of his time, having been one of the first people to translate the Qur’an from Arabic to Persian and Urdu. For his achievements, Maulvi Ferozuddin is one of the few people to have been buried at Data Darbar, which is considered to be the oldest Sufi shrine of South Asia.

Maulvi Ferozuddin originally began publishing books at the behest of then Director Education of the British Raj William Bell. He also authored many books, his first being the Urdu translation of Data Ganj Baksh’s book “Kushuf-ul-Mujoob.”

Maulvi Ferozuddin originally established Ferozsons Limited in Chohotay Mufti Baqar inside the historical walled city of Lahore. From the beginning, Maulvi Ferozuddin's vision of business extended beyond accumulating wealth, and he firmly incorporated the enrichment of human life in the under-developed South Asian region.

Thus the publishing house was created not only as a means of creating wealth, but as one of spreading literacy and education among the masses of the sub-continent.

In 1904, the company offices and printing plant then moved to its own purpose built premises on Circular Road, Sheranwala Gate. Ferozsons opened its first bookshop in 1947 on the Mall in Lahore which is also the company's head office.

Operations 
Now the company is spread countrywide in 26 big cities of Pakistan. It does the publishing, printing and selling of the books. It is a large book distribution network in Pakistan. It has created its retailing and distribution network in 200 markets including Lahore, Karachi, Rawalpindi and other major cities of Pakistan. Company has five outlets in Lahore and one each in Karachi and Rawalpindi with its head-office at The Mall road, Lahore.

Closure of historic branch 
The Ghulam Rasool building at The Mall, Lahore where Ferozsons started operations was closed down in January 2017, while the company operated from other branches in the city and elsewhere in the country. In the summer of 2012, the bookstore survived a fire which continued for days and caused losses worth an estimated Rs150 million. The fire started on May 30 and caused the wooden roof of the building to collapse.

Within a month of the fire, the bookstore opened to the public again. The management made temporary arrangements and restarted sales on June 27, 2012 with a five-member team managing it. However, the building itself took months to get restored to its former state.

Publications 
Some of its publishing books, journals and magazines are:
 Ambri (1974, poem)
 For Hire
 Pir-e-Kamil
 Taleem-o-Tarbiat
 Kashmiris fight for freedom
 The Poverty Curtain
 Painting in Pakistan
 Ideology of Pakistan
 English to Urdu Dictionary

See also 
 List of Urdu language book publishing companies
The Printing & Packaging Division of Ferozsons Pvt Ltd , https://ferozsons-printing-packaging-division.business.site/

References 

Publishing companies of Pakistan
Book publishing companies of Pakistan
Bookstores of Pakistan
Publishing companies established in 1894
Mass media in Lahore
The Mall, Lahore
Companies based in Lahore
1894 establishments in India